Tyler Garcia-Posey (born October 18, 1991) is an American actor and musician. He performed in his early years in a number of children's film and television roles, for which he was twice nominated for a Young Artist Award. He was known for his roles as Raul Garcia in Doc (2001–2004) and Ty Ventura in Maid in Manhattan (2002). As an adult, he is known for playing the central character Scott McCall in the MTV series Teen Wolf (2011–2017), although he has since been cast in a number of film roles and has also performed in voice acting roles. In late 2011 to 2012, he won a number of youth acting awards, including a Teen Choice Award, and was nominated for several others. He was active for several years in the band Lost in Kostko, which he co-founded in 2009.

Early life
Posey was born in Santa Monica, California, to Cyndi Terese Garcia and actor-writer John Posey. He grew up in Santa Clarita, California. Posey has two brothers. He is of Mexican descent on his mother's side.

Career
Posey has worked steadily in film and television. In February 2002, he appeared in the film Collateral Damage; in December of that year, he played the main character's son in the romantic comedy Maid in Manhattan. He auditioned for the role of Jacob Black in the Twilight film series in 2007 but lost the role to his friend Taylor Lautner. The two regularly auditioned for the same roles as child actors.

That same year, Posey voiced a character in the pilot of the Disney original cartoon SheZow, which aired on May 4 as a part of the Shorty McShorts' Shorts miniseries. In 2012, he co-starred in the film White Frog. In 2011, Posey was cast in his breakout role as the lead in the MTV television series Teen Wolf, which is based on the 1985 film. Posey plays high school student Scott McCall, who is bitten by a werewolf and must keep this fact secret while protecting his loved ones from a host of supernatural threats and beings. In 2015, he also became a co-producer for the fifth season of Teen Wolf.

On May 24, 2017, Posey was cast as Lucas Moreno in the Blumhouse supernatural thriller film Truth or Dare. The film was released in theaters on April 13, 2018.

On September 25, 2017, it was announced that Posey would join the third season of the VH1 slasher television series Scream, starring in the role of Shane. The season premiered on July 8, 2019.

On February 20, 2019, it was announced that Posey would star as Michael Emerson in The CW's television reboot series of The Lost Boys. On July 29, 2019, it was announced The CW was unhappy with the pilot and that Posey, along with most of the rest of the cast, would be recast.

On November 18, 2019, it was announced that Posey would star in Netflix's animated Fast & Furious television series Fast & Furious: Spy Racers, which premiered on December 26, 2019.

In September 2021, it was announced that a reunion film for Teen Wolf had been ordered by Paramount+, with Jeff Davis returning as a screenwriter and executive producer of the film. The majority of the original cast members, including Posey, were set to reprise their roles, with Posey also serving as a producer. The film was released on January 26, 2023.

Other work
Posey used to front and play guitar in the band Disappearing Jamie, formerly known as Lost in Kostko. Their first performance was at The Roxy in Los Angeles in 2012. Lost in Kostko released their eight-track EP You're Going to Need a Towel in 2011. Posey announced the band's breakup via Instagram on July 17, 2013.

In December 2016, Posey was a guest DJ at Emo Nite LA's second anniversary at the Echoplex in Los Angeles.

Posey played guitar and contributed vocals in the pop punk band PVMNTS along with guitarist/bassist/vocalist Freddy Ramirez and drummer Nick Guzman. The trio released the song "Standing (On My Own Two Feet)" on June 14, 2018, on which Posey wrote about the passing of his mother in 2014. The band self-released their six-track EP Better Days on August 17, 2018. In April 2019, it was announced that Posey had left the band and was pursuing another music venture, which became the band Five North.

Five North is a pop-punk rock band formed by childhood best friends Posey and Kyle Murphy. Posey and Murphy originate from just off "The 5" (Interstate 5 in California) in Santa Clarita, California, hence the origin of the band's name Five North. The two recruited Makeout drummer Scott Eckel after being introduced by music producer and close friend John Feldmann. Five North's debut single "This Mess" was released on October 4, 2019, and their debut eight-track EP Scumbag was released on March 6, 2020, via Big Noise Music Group.

In August 2021, Posey made a cameo appearance in the music video for "Broke", the song by UK pop-punk band the Bottom Line, who Posey met when touring the UK together in 2018 during his time in PVMNTS.

Personal life 
Posey became engaged to his childhood sweetheart, Seana Gorlick, in 2013. The couple broke off the engagement that same year, after a ten-year relationship.

Posey's mother, Cyndi Terese Garcia, died of breast cancer in December 2014. The fifth season of Teen Wolf was dedicated to her memory.

In an October 2020 interview, Posey disclosed that he had begun smoking marijuana at the age of 12 and had developed an addiction. At that time, Posey stated that he had been sober for 71 days. In March 2021, Posey stated that he was no longer sober but added that he had learned a great deal from his experience of sobriety.

Also in October 2020, Posey revealed that he had "hooked up" with men and does not like to label his sexuality. In an interview on Sirius XM, Posey said, "I was hit with wanting to come out myself and be honest about it. I know a lot of kids look up to me, and I want to get rid of that stigma." In July 2021, Posey came out as queer and sexually fluid.

Filmography

Film

Television

Music videos

Awards and nominations

Discography

Solo
Drugs [EP] (2021)

With Lost in Kostko
You're Gonna Need A Towel [EP] (2011)

With PVMNTS
Better Days [EP] (2018)

With Five North
Scumbag [EP] (2020)

References

External links

 
 
 

1991 births
Living people
21st-century American male actors
Male actors from Santa Clarita, California
American rock guitarists
American male guitarists
American male child actors
American male film actors
American male television actors
American male voice actors
Hispanic and Latino American male actors
Hispanic and Latino American musicians
Lead guitarists
Male actors from Santa Monica, California
Musicians from Santa Monica, California
Guitarists from California
21st-century American guitarists
21st-century American male musicians
Queer actors
American LGBT actors
LGBT male actors
American LGBT musicians
Queer musicians
LGBT people from California
Queer men
OnlyFans creators
Sexually fluid men